The 2008 Asia Series was contested on November 13–16 by the champions of Nippon Professional Baseball's Japan Series, the Korea Baseball Organization's Korean Series, Chinese Professional Baseball League's Taiwan Series, and the championship of the China Baseball League of the People's Republic of China. In 2008, it was the first time that the champion of the China Baseball League participates in instead of the all-star team China Stars. The winning team will receive ¥50 million yen ($0.5 million), the second place team will receive ¥30 million yen, and the other teams will receive ¥10 million yen each. All games were held in Tokyo Dome, Tokyo, Japan. The Saitama Seibu Lions defeated the Uni-President 7-Eleven Lions in the title game to win the championship for Japan. Outfielder Tomoaki Satoh was named the MVP of the series.

Participating teams 
 China Baseball League (China): Tianjin Lions, winner of 2008 CBL championship series. Based in Tianjin, China.
 Nippon Professional Baseball (Japan): Saitama Seibu Lions, winner of 2008 Japan Series. Based in Saitama, Japan.
 Korea Baseball Organization (Korea): SK Wyverns, winner of 2008 Korea Series. Based in Incheon, South Korea.
 Chinese Professional Baseball League (Taiwan): Uni-President 7-Eleven Lions, winner of 2008 Taiwan Series. Based in Tainan, Taiwan.

Matchups 
All times are Japan Standard Time (UTC+9)

November 13 

Attendance: 2,788    Time: 3:04

Attendance: 9,277    Time: 3:03

November 14 

Attendance: 2,489    Time: 2:27 (shorten: mercy rule)

Attendance: 8,443    Time: 2:34

November 15 

Attendance: 8,478    Time: 2:41 (shorten: mercy rule)

Attendance: 5,228    Time: 3:22

Round Robin Standings

Championship, November 16 
Attendance: 18,370    Time: 3:07

Broadcasting 
  TBS: SK Wyverns vs. Saitama Seibu Lions (G2)
  Asahi: Saitama Seibu Lions vs. Uni-President 7-Eleven Lions (G4)
  NTV: Tianjin Lions vs. Saitama Seibu Lions (G5), Championship (G7)
  J SPORTS: All games.
  MBC ESPN: All games.
  KBS 2TV : SK Wyverns vs. Saitama Seibu Lions (G2)
  SBS : Championship (G7)
  VL: All games.

See also 
 2008 China Baseball League season
 2008 Chinese Professional Baseball League season
 2008 Korea Baseball Organization season
 2008 Nippon Professional Baseball season

References

External links 
 2008 Asia Series Official Website

Asia Series
Asia Series
International baseball competitions hosted by Japan
Saitama Seibu Lions
Asia Series
Asia Series
Asia Series
Sports competitions in Tokyo